John Walter Stephan (1906–1995) was an American painter in the Hard-edge style. His magazine The Tigers Eye was widely read and is considered a lastingly influential magazine of art and literature. He was a contemporary and friends with such notable artists as Mark Rothko, Clyfford Still and William Baziotes

Early life
John Stephan was born in Maywood, Illinois to a father who was a dentist and a mother who was a nurse, and his family moved to Chicago in 1917 he attended the University of Illinois and later the School of the Art Institute of Chicago.

Career
After attending the School of the Art Institute of Chicago he worked as an Art Instructor at Jane Addams Hull House, in Chicago and later was a Draftsman, at Western Electric in Chicago. His first solo exhibition was in 1931 with many other solo and group exhibitions of note.

Personal life
He was married to Ruth Walgreen, than Ruth Stephan, who was the daughter of Walgreens founder Charles Rudolph Walgreen.

Notable exhibitions
9th Street Art Exhibition

Notable collections
Yale University Art Gallery
Smithsonian American Art Museum
Museum of Fine Arts, Boston
Rose Art Museum

References

External links

 Interview with John Stephan, ca. 1987 from the Smithsonian Archives of American Art
 John Stephan Biography, Wyeth Alexander galleries 
 John Stephan Biography, Rhode Island international film festival 
 Askart.com information

1906 births
1995 deaths
Modern painters
Painters from New York City
20th-century American painters
American male painters
Painters from Illinois
Hunter College faculty
Federal Art Project artists
School of the Art Institute of Chicago alumni
People from Maywood, Illinois
20th-century American male artists